The Lock Haven Formation is a Devonian mapped bedrock unit in Pennsylvania, in the Appalachian Mountains of the United States.

Description
The Lock Haven is gray to green-brown sandstone, siltstone, and shale and is over 400 million years old. It is located in northcentral Pennsylvania.

Stratigraphy
The Lock Haven may underlie various members of the Catskill Formation, although it may be a lateral equivalent of  the Sherman Creek or Irish Valley Members of the Catskill.  It is also a lateral equivalent of the Foreknobs Formation and underlying Scherr Formation.  The Brallier Formation usually underlies the Lock Haven.

The Minnehaha Springs Member (originally proposed as a member of the Scherr Formation) is a "clastic bundle" consisting of interbedded medium gray siltstone and olive gray shale with some grayish-red siltstone and shale and some sandstone. It is interpreted as turbidites.  This member is proposed to define the base of the Lock Haven Formation.

Notable Exposures
 Pine Creek Gorge
 Leberfinger Quarry, near Forksville in Sullivan County, Pennsylvania. Fossils at this location include Brachiopods and carbonized plant fossils, while trace fossils include Cruziana, Arenicolites, and Rhizocorallium.

References

See also
Geology of Pennsylvania

Devonian geology of Pennsylvania
Devonian southern paleotemperate deposits